CGS Syed Nazrul is a Leader Class offshore patrol vessel of the Bangladesh Coast Guard. She is serving the Bangladesh Coast Guard since 2017.

History
The ship was laid down on 11 March 1985 at Fincantieri and launched at 3 April 1986. She was commissioned to the Italian Navy as an ASW corvette named Minerva (F 551) at 10 June 1987. In 2015, she was decommissioned from the Italian Navy and sold to the Bangladesh Coast Guard. Then the ship has gone through extensive refit at Fincantieri where it was converted to an offshore patrol vessel. All sensors and armaments were removed from the ship and replaced by the Bangladesh Coast Guard requirements.

Career
Syed Nazrul was handed over to the Bangladesh Coast Guard on 5 August 2016. She left Italy for Bangladesh on 3 September 2016 and reached Chittagong, Bangladesh on 2 November 2016. She was commissioned to the Bangladesh Coast Guard on 12 January 2017.

Syed Nazrul participated in Langkawi International Maritime and Aerospace Exhibition (LIMA)-2019, held between 26 and 30 March. She left Chattogram to take part in the event on 18 March 2019. During the tour, she will also visit the Port Blair of India and Phuket port of Thailand on goodwill mission.

See also
 List of ships of the Bangladesh Coast Guard
 CGS Tajuddin
 CGS Mansoor Ali
 CGS Kamruzzaman

References

Ships of the Bangladesh Coast Guard
1986 ships
Ships built by Fincantieri
Ships built in Italy